Szabolcs Balajcza (born 14 July 1979 in Kaposvár) is a Hungarian football goalkeeper who currently plays for Hetes Vikár.

Honours
Újpest
Hungarian Cup (1): 2013–14

References

External links
 Player profile at HLSZ 
 

Player profile at Siófok 

Living people
1979 births
People from Kaposvár
Hungarian footballers
Association football goalkeepers
Kaposvári Rákóczi FC players
Újpest FC players
BFC Siófok players
Nemzeti Bajnokság I players
Sportspeople from Somogy County